Highlands Museum of the Arts is an art museum in Sebring, Florida, Highlands County, Florida. The museum is located in the Alan Altvater Cultural Center and is operated by the Highland Arts League.

Exhibits have included art across many media such as painting, printmaking, sculpture, photography, digital imagery and projection. The museum also offers classes, and hosts art competitions and artist receptions.

References

External links
Highland Arts League website

Art museums and galleries in Florida
Buildings and structures in Sebring, Florida
Museums in Highlands County, Florida